Filthy Rich is an American drama television series created by Tate Taylor for the Fox Broadcasting Company. It is based on the New Zealand series of the same name. The series was originally supposed to premiere as a spring entry during the 2019–20 television season, but ended up being pushed to fall 2020 upon the outbreak of the COVID-19 pandemic. In October 2020, the series was canceled five episodes into its freshman run. The series concluded the following month.

Premise
Described as a "Gothic family drama in which wealth, power and religion collide—with outrageously soapy results", the series centers on a mega-rich Southern family who made their money through a Christian television network based in Louisiana. The sudden passing of the network's founder in a plane crash brings out three more family members (his illegitimate children who were written into his will due to him having affairs with different women), all of whom want to inherit the empire for their own reasons.

Cast and characters

Main

 Kim Cattrall as Margaret Monreaux, a TV host and co-founder of the Sunshine Network, who is determined to control the business by any means necessary when her co-founder husband unexpectedly dies
 Melia Kreiling as Ginger Sweets, the vengeful daughter of a Las Vegas cocktail waitress and one of Eugene's illegitimate children who runs a cam-girl website; she stands in the way of Margaret's plans to get her, Antonio, and Jason out of the business
 Steve Harris as Franklin Lee, a lawyer and legal advisor to the Monreaux family who helped them build the Sunshine Network; he assists Margaret as she deals with the fallout of Eugene's death
 Aubrey Dollar as Rose Monreaux, a fashion designer trying to distance herself from her mother, who she feels doesn't support her ambitions
 Corey Cott as Eric Monreaux, the VP of the Sunshine Network and aspiring heir apparent to his father's business
 Benjamin Levy Aguilar as Antonio Rivera, a single dad and MMA fighter, and one of Eugene's illegitimate children
 Mark L. Young as Jason Conley / Mark, a Colorado marijuana grower who is also one of Eugene's illegitimate children, and has a different agenda that he's keeping to himself; he later reveals to Rose that he's really Mark, the adoptive brother of the real Jason who is in a coma, and is assuming Jason's identity for the money
 Olivia Macklin as Becky Monreaux, Eric's snooty wife and sister of Reverend Thomas; she is pregnant at the start of the series
 Aaron Lazar as Reverend Paul Luke Thomas, a beloved, popular, influential and very ambitious televangelist who is considered the most popular personality on the Sunshine Network other than Margaret; he seeks to sow discord between Margaret and her family so he can usurp control of the business
 Gerald McRaney as Eugene Monreaux, Margaret's minister husband and a conservative icon who founded the Sunshine Network, and whose apparent death revealed his secret life; however, Eugene is revealed at the end of the first episode to still be alive

Recurring
 Deneen Tyler as Norah Ellington, Margaret's friend and loyal director of the Sunshine Network
 Aqueela Zoll as Rachel, Ginger's best friend and co-worker in her online porn business
 Rachel York as Tina Sweet, Ginger's fragile mother who had an affair with Eugene years ago
 Cranston Johnson as Luke Taylor, an investigative journalist trying to uncover the Monreaux family secrets
 Annie Golden as Ellie, a pious woman who rescues Eugene from the plane crash wreckage in the swamp, and as Margaret's mother in flashbacks
 Alanna Ubach as Yopi Candalaria, Antonio's ambitious mother who is using her son for her own ends
 Kenny Alfonso as Don Bouchard, a MMA promoter, who is one of three Sunshine Network investors and a member of the 18:20 working with Reverend Thomas to wrest control from Margaret
 Carl Palmer as Townes Dockerty, one of three Sunshine Network investors and a member of the 18:20 working with Reverend Thomas to wrest control from Margaret
 Thomas Francis Murphy as Hagamond Sheen, a scripture-spouting thug and enforcer who works for the 18:20
 Gia Carides as Veronica, the promiscuous wife of Townes Dockerty, who is secretly the mother of the real Jason Conley

Guest
 Juliette Lewis as Juliette, a store manager who hires Eugene (in "Psalm 25:3", "Romans 8:30"), and Eugene's mother (in "1 Corinthians 3:13")
 John McConnell as Virgil Love, the Governor of Louisiana, a member of the 18:20 and one of three Sunshine Network investors who is working with Reverend Thomas to wrest control from Margaret (in "Psalm 25:3", "Romans 8:30", and "Proverbs 20:6")
 Tina Lifford as Monique, Franklin's mother (in "Romans 8:30", "Romans 12:21", and "1 Corinthians 3:13")

Episodes

Production

Development 
On December 19, 2018, it was announced that Fox had given a pilot order to an adaptation of Filthy Rich pitched by Tate Taylor, who also served as executive producer. Production companies involved with the pilot included Imagine Television Studios, Wyolah Films, Fox Entertainment, and the Disney-owned 20th Television. On May 9, 2019, it was announced that the production had been given a series order. Originally intended to air in the fall of 2019, the series was pushed back to Spring due to scheduling conflicts involving Taylor. The outbreak of the COVID-19 pandemic resulted in the series premiere being further pushed to fall 2020, in order to shore-up the network's schedule. On October 30, 2020, Fox cancelled the series after one season. The remaining episodes continued to air at their regular timeslot, before concluding on November 30, 2020.

Casting 
In February 2019, it was announced that Kim Cattrall had been cast in the lead role for the pilot, then others including Aubrey Dollar, Benjamin Levy Aguilar, Corey Cott and Mark L. Young had joined the pilot. It was then announced in March 2019 that Gerald McRaney had joined the cast. Alongside the pilot's order announcement, in March 2019 it was reported that Steve Harris, Melia Kreiling, David Denman and Olivia Macklin had joined the cast. On May 11, 2019, it was reported that Denman, who was originally cast to play the male lead opposite Cattrall in the series, had exited and his role would be recast. On September 13, 2019, Aaron Lazar was cast as Reverend Paul Luke Thomas, replacing both Denman and Steven Pasquale.

Similarity to previous show

In 1982, a sitcom, Filthy Rich created by Linda Bloodworth-Thomason, had a similar plot line in which the family of a deceased wealthy land baron would not see a dime of his inheritance unless they accepted his illegitimate son and family into their own.

Release
On May 13, 2019, Fox released the first official trailer for the series, where it premiered on September 21, 2020.

In Canada, the series premiered on CTV on September 21, 2020. In India, the series premiered on Disney+ Hotstar on September 22, 2020.

In selected international territories, the series premiered on Disney+ under the dedicated streaming hub Star as an original series, starting March 12, 2021.

Reception

Critical response
For the series, review aggregator Rotten Tomatoes reported a critic approval rating of 64% based on 14 reviews, with an average rating of 6.55/10. The website's critics consensus reads, "Kim Cattrall shines, but Filthy Rich is neither filthy nor rich enough to fulfill its soapy aspirations."  Metacritic gave the series a weighted average score of 54 out of 100 based on 14 reviews, indicating "mixed or average reviews".

Ratings

Notes

References

External links
 

2020 American television series debuts
2020 American television series endings
2020s American comedy-drama television series
2020s American satirical television series
2020s American LGBT-related television series
American television series based on New Zealand television series
Christianity in popular culture
Fox Broadcasting Company original programming
Mass media portrayals of the upper class
Serial drama television series
Television productions postponed due to the COVID-19 pandemic
Television series about families
Television series about television
Television series about widowhood
Television series by Fox Entertainment
Television shows set in New Orleans
Television series by 20th Century Fox Television
Television series by Imagine Entertainment